Ashley Elizabeth Yoder (born October 20, 1987) is an American mixed martial artist and competes in Strawweight division of the Ultimate Fighting Championship (UFC).

Biography 
Yoder was born on October 20, 1987 in Indianapolis, Indiana, United States. At the age of three, her parents got divorced and she and her brother were raised by her mother. During her high school years at Mitchell High School (Indiana), Yoder was involved in cheerleading, dance and competed in track and field.  She attended Indiana University and received  two Bachelor's Degrees in Criminal Justice and African American Diaspora Studies.

Prior to starting to fight professionally, Yoder worked as a lifeguard.

Mixed martial arts career

Early career 
On her 18th birthday, Yoder lost her brother in a car accident, followed by the death of her cousin two years later. She started training in MMA after a friend introduced her to the combat sport. Yoder only fell in love with mixed martial arts after she had her first fight. Prior to that, she mainly used MMA as a channel to vent out her anger of the loss of her brother.

Yoder participated in the UFC's The Ultimate Fighter 20 tryouts, but did not make the cut to be a cast member. She attempted to make it into the show again in April 2016, trying out for TUF 23. Yoder was chosen to appear on that season of TUF, and was signed by UFC later that year.

Yoder fought most of her fights in the California circuit under BAMMA USA, Invicta and Gladiator Challenge promotions and amassed a record of 5–1 prior joining UFC.

The Ultimate Fighter 
Yoder competed in the strawweight tournament under Joanna Jędrzejczyk's team on the Ultimate Fighting Championship (UFC) produced reality television series The Ultimate Fighter (TUF) 23, also known as The Ultimate Fighter: Team Joanna vs. Team Cláudia. Yoder took on Jodie Esquibel in round 1 and won the fight via split decision. Yoder moved on to face Kate Jackson, where she lost the fight via unanimous decision.

Ultimate Fighting Championship 
Yoder made her promotional debut on December 9, 2016 at UFC Fight Night: Lewis vs. Abdurakhimov in Albany, New York against Justine Kish. At the weight-in Kish came in at 116.4 Ibs, over the strawweight limit of 116 Ibs, and she was fined 20% of her pay to Yoder. She lost the fight via unanimous decision with the scorecards 29-28 across the board.

Yoder faced Angela Hill on July 7, 2017 at The Ultimate Fighter 25 Finale. She lost the fight by unanimous decision.

Yoder faced promotional newcomer Mackenzie Dern on March 3, 2018 at UFC 222. She lost the fight via split decision.

Yoder faced Amanda Cooper on November 10, 2018 UFC Fight Night 139. She won the fight via a split decision.

Yoder faced Syuri Kondo on June 22, 2019 at UFC Fight Night 153. She won the fight via unanimous decision.

Yoder was scheduled to face Yan Xiaonan on October 26, 2019 at UFC Fight Night 162. However, Yan pulled out of the fight in late-September citing a foot injury. She was replaced by Randa Markos. She lost the fight via split decision.

As the first fight of her new four-fight contract, Yoder faced Lívia Renata Souza on August 15, 2020 at UFC 252. She lost the fight via unanimous decision.

Yoder faced Miranda Granger on November 14, 2020 at UFC Fight Night: Felder vs. dos Anjos. She won the fight via unanimous decision.

Yoder was scheduled to face Angela Hill in a rematch on February 27, 2021 at UFC Fight Night 186. However, day of the fight it was announced that the bout was scrapped due to safety protocols after one of Yoder's cornermen tested positive for COVID-19. The bout was rescheduled and took place at UFC Fight Night: Edwards vs. Muhammad on March 13. Yoder lost the fight via unanimous decision.

Yoder faced Jinh Yu Frey on July 31, 2021 at UFC on ESPN 28. She lost the fight via unanimous decision.

As the first bout of her new four-fight contract, Yoder was scheduled to face Vanessa Demopoulos on January 15, 2022 at UFC on ESPN 32. However, Yoder withdrew from the event for undisclosed reasons and she was replaced by Silvana Gómez Juárez.

Personal life 
Yoder is a dog lover and owns a dog named "Beth".

Mixed martial arts record

|-
|Loss
|align=center|8–8
|Jinh Yu Frey
|Decision (unanimous)
|UFC on ESPN: Hall vs. Strickland
|
|align=center|3
|align=center|5:00
|Las Vegas, Nevada, United States
|
|-
|Loss
|align=center|8–7
|Angela Hill
|Decision (unanimous)
|UFC Fight Night: Edwards vs. Muhammad
|
|align=center|3
|align=center|5:00
|Las Vegas, Nevada, United States
|
|-
|Win
|align=center|8–6
|Miranda Granger
|Decision (unanimous)
|UFC Fight Night: Felder vs. dos Anjos
|
|align=center|3
|align=center|5:00
|Las Vegas, Nevada, United States
|
|-
|Loss
|align=center|7–6
|Lívia Renata Souza
|Decision (unanimous)
|UFC 252
|
|align=center|3
|align=center|5:00
|Las Vegas, Nevada, United States
|
|-
|Loss
|align=center|7–5
|Randa Markos
|Decision (split)
|UFC Fight Night: Maia vs. Askren
|
|align=center|3
|align=center|5:00
|Kallang, Singapore
| 
|-
|Win
|align=center|7–4
|Syuri Kondo
|Decision (unanimous)
|UFC Fight Night: Moicano vs. The Korean Zombie
|
|align=center|3
|align=center|5:00
|Greenville, South Carolina, United States
|
|-
|Win
|align=center|6–4
|Amanda Cooper
|Decision (split)
|UFC Fight Night: The Korean Zombie vs. Rodríguez
|
|align=center|3
|align=center|5:00
|Denver, Colorado, United States
|
|-
|Loss
|align=center|5–4
|Mackenzie Dern
|Decision (split)
|UFC 222
|
|align=center|3
|align=center|5:00
|Las Vegas, Nevada, United States
|
|-
|Loss
|align=center|5–3
|Angela Hill
|Decision (unanimous)
|The Ultimate Fighter: Redemption Finale
|
|align=center|3
|align=center|5:00
|Las Vegas, Nevada, United States
|
|-
|Loss
|align=center|5–2
|Justine Kish
|Decision (unanimous)
|UFC Fight Night: Lewis vs. Abdurakhimov
|
|align=center|3
|align=center|5:00
|Albany, New York, United States
|
|-
| Win
| align=center| 5–1
| Amber Brown
| Submission (armbar)
| Invicta FC 20: Evinger vs. Kunitskaya
| 
| align=center| 2
| align=center| 2:31
| Kansas City, Missouri, United States
|
|-
| Win
| align=center| 4–1
| Angela Danzig
| Submission (armbar)
| BAMMA USA: Badbeat 17
| 
| align=center| 1
| align=center| 4:50
| Commerce, California, United States
|
|-
| Win
| align=center| 3–1
| Liz Tracy
| Decision (split)
| BAMMA USA: Badbeat 16
| 
| align=center| 3
| align=center| 5:00
| Commerce, California, United States
|
|-
| Win
| align=center| 2–1
| Misha Nassiri
| Submission (armbar)
| BAMMA USA: Badbeat 14
| 
| align=center| 1
| align=center| 1:02
| Commerce, California, United States
|
|-
| Loss
| align=center| 1–1
| Maria Rios
| Decision (unanimous)
| BAMMA USA: Badbeat 13
| 
| align=center| 3
| align=center| 3:00
| Commerce, California, United States
|
|-
|Win
| align=center| 1–0
| Catalina Madril
| Submission (armbar)
| Gladiator Challenge: Uprising
| 
| align=center| 1
| align=center| 0:15
| San Jacinto, California, United States
|
|-

See also
 List of current UFC fighters
 List of female mixed martial artists

References

External links
 
 

Living people
1987 births
American female mixed martial artists
Strawweight mixed martial artists
Mixed martial artists utilizing Brazilian jiu-jitsu
Mixed martial artists from Indiana
Sportspeople from Indianapolis
Indiana University alumni
Ultimate Fighting Championship female fighters
American practitioners of Brazilian jiu-jitsu
Female Brazilian jiu-jitsu practitioners
People awarded a black belt in Brazilian jiu-jitsu
21st-century American women